Aarohan is an Indian TV series that aired on DD National from 1996 to 1997. The show was written and produced by Pallavi Joshi, who also played the character of protagonist Nikita Sachdev.

Overview
Aarohan takes place in a make-believe scenario about women cadets joining Indian Navy (as women could not join combat force in Indian Navy then). It followed their lives and their training in the Naval Academy. The 13-episode series ended with a climax where cadets dealt with a war-like scenario.

The show's lead is a headstrong, passionate defence forces girl, Nikita. Her father (Satyen Kappu) and brother (Amit Behl) are in the Indian Army. She has a shy friend (Shefali Shah), who joins the academy with her.

Anju Mahendru, Arun Bali, Tarun Dhanrajgir, Harsh Chhaya all play naval officers of different ranks in the academy. Girish Malik plays Nikita's friend. R Madhavan has a cameo role of a naval officer.

Cast 
 Pallavi Joshi as Cadet Nikita Sachdev
 Shefali Shah as Cadet Nivedita Sen
 Tarun Dhanrajgir as Lt. Commander Siddharth Khurana
 Anju Mahendru as Commander Kashmira Khurana
 Parveen Dastur as Cadet Vinita Krishnamurti
 Harsh Chhaya as Lt. Rohit Sharma
 Girish Malik as Sahil Khurana
 Amit Behl as Flying Officer Nikhil Sachdev
 Arun Bali as Rear Admiral Karan Khurana
 R Madhavan as Lt. Shammi
 Satyen Kappu as Colonel Arun Sachdev
 Kashmera Shah as Lata (Special Appearance only in Episode no 11)

References

External links 
 

DD National original programming
1996 Indian television series debuts
Indian Armed Forces in fiction
1997 Indian television series endings